The following is a list of the number-one music videos of 2018 on the weekly Billboard China V Chart. The chart ranks the weekly most viewed music videos using data from Chinese video-sharing site YinYueTai.

Chart history

See also 

2018 in Chinese music
List of Global Chinese Pop Chart number-one songs of 2018

References 

YinYueTai
China V Chart
China V Chart
Chinese music industry
V Chart 2018
China V Chart Videos 2018